Neogaya is a monotypic genus of flowering plants belonging to the family Apiaceae. It just contains one species, Neogaya simplex (L.) Meisn. 
It can be found in Europe, in the Alps, the western and southern Carpathians, also former Yugoslavia, Belarus and the European parts of Russia. It is also found in Asia, within Kazakhstan, China, and western Siberia.

Description
It has glabrous (smooth), straight, erect stems, that are grooved or ribbed. It has basal leaves, which have a long petiole (leaf stalk). They are linear-lanceolate, or ovate shaped. They are dark green with a purplish margin, and measure 3–6 cm long and 2–5 cm wide.
In Europe, it blooms from June to August. They are in shades of white or pinkish. After flowering it produces a seed capsule or 'fruit', which like other members of the Apiaceae family, is polachenarium, a dry schizocarpic fruit consisting of monocarps separating from a longitudinal central axis (columella or carpophore), often remaining attached to the axis at maturity. It is about 3–5 mm long, and 3.2-3.6 mm wide, with dark brownish lilca stripes. It is broadly ellipsoidal, or prolonged ellipsoid, with a dorsal side that is convex with five winged ridges.

Taxonomy
The genus name of Neogaya is in honour of Jaques Étienne Gay (1786–1864), a Swiss-French botanist, civil servant, collector and taxonomist. The Latin specific epithet of simplex means simple or unbranched from simplicissimus.
Both the genus and the species were first described and published in Pl. Vasc. Gen. Vol.1 on page 104 in 1837.

This species has rather large synonymy due to its complicated generic delimitation in Asiatic high mountainous Apiaceae family with similar lifeforms (see
Pimenov, 1982; Lavrova et al., 1987; Pimenov & Kljuykov, 2001). The species was re-established as the genus Neogaya Meisn. during the revision of Middle Asiatic taxa of the Apiaceae (Pimenov, 1982, 1983).

The genus is recognised by United States Department of Agriculture and the Agricultural Research Service, but they do not list any known species. The 21 known synonyms of the species are listed in the taxobox (top righthand corner).
It is accepted by the Global Biodiversity Information Facility, and Tropicos.

It has the common name of 'Small Alpine Lovage', or 'Alpine lovage' with the most commonly known synonym of Ligusticum mutellinoides Vill.
In Slovakia, it is known as 'simple dill'.

Distribution and habitat

Range
It is found in Europe, within the countries of Austria, Czechoslovakia, France, Germany, Italy, Romania, Poland, Switzerland and Yugoslavia. This is includes the mountains of the Alps, the Carpathians and the Balkans.
It is found in Russia, within the regions of Altai Krai, Siberia (in Irkutsk Oblast, Krasnoyarsk Krai, Yakutskiya, Buryatia, Chita Oblast) and the Far Eastern Federal District (in Khabarovsk Krai, Kamchatka Krai, Magadan Oblast).
It is found in Asia, within Kazakhstan, Mongolia, Uzbekistan and Xinjiang (in China).

Habitat
It grows on Alpine meadows, on rocky or stony areas, stony meadows, or grassy areas, on overgrown rocks, and rubble or screes, at the subalpine and alpine regions.

References

Other sources
 Pimenov M.G., 1982. Two new genera of Umbelliferae from the group of Ligusticeae. Bjull. Moskovsk. Obsc. Isp. Prir. Otd. Biol. 87(1): 111–117. (in Russian, with Latin diagnoses).
 Pimenov, M.G. 1983. Umbelliferae. In: Vvedensky, A.I. (Ed.), Conspectus Florae Asiae Mediae 7: 167–322. Tashkent

Flora of Africa
Apioideae
Plants described in 1837
Flora of France
Flora of Central Europe
Flora of Italy
Flora of Belarus
Flora of Ukraine
Flora of Siberia
Flora of the Russian Far East
Flora of Kazakhstan
Flora of Mongolia
Flora of Uzbekistan
Flora of Xinjiang
Monotypic Apioideae genera